Breadalbane  is a rural locality in the local government area (LGA) of Northern Midlands in the Central LGA region of Tasmania. The 2016 census recorded a population of 108 for the state suburb of Breadalbane.

History 
Breadalbane was gazetted as a locality in 1959.

It was named by Governor Macquarie after the Earl of Breadalbane, his wife's cousin. Earlier the district was known as 'Cocked Hat', 'The Springs' and 'Brumby's Plain'.

Breadalbane Post Office opened on 1 October 1847 and closed in 1968.

The Breadalbane area was notorious in the early 19th century for sheep stealing. In the colonial days there were three inns at Breadalbane, The Albion, The Temperance Hotel, and The Woolpack Inn (today, only the Woolpack Inn still stands).

Today, there is an important roundabout at Breadalbane at the entrance to the city of Launceston, and Launceston Airport.

Geography
Almost all the boundaries are survey lines.

Road infrastructure 
National Route 1 (Midland Highway) runs through from north to south.

References 

Localities of Northern Midlands Council